Arno Paduch (* 1965 Hattersheim am Main, Germany) is a German cornetto player, conductor and musicologist.

After highschool degree in Friedberg (Germany), Paduch studied musicology at Goethe University Frankfurt (Germany) and afterwards
cornetto and historic performance practice at Schola Cantorum Basiliensis in Basle (Switzerland). Still being a student, in 1992 he received a teaching assignment for cornetto and ensemble playing at the early music division of
University of Music and Theatre Leipzig which he has been keeping until today. In 1995 Paduch founded the Johann Rosenmüller Ensemble Leipzig,
specialised on music of the 17th and 18th centuries.

As a conductor and cornetto player, he gave acclaimed concerts on several places and early music festivals all around Germany and Europe.

External links 
 
 Johann Rosenmüller Ensemble

German male conductors (music)
Cornett players
Living people
21st-century German conductors (music)
21st-century German male musicians
Year of birth missing (living people)